The Celebrity Cricket League (CCL) is an amateur men's cricket league in India. It consists of eight teams of film actors from eight film industries of Indian cinema. The league commenced in 2011. Salman Khan is Brand Ambassador for Celebrity Cricket League from 2011 for all seasons. The CCL teams use various venues for their home games and it has a vast coverage in Indian media.

Establishment
The popularity of the Indian Premier League (official T20 League Tournament of India) inspired the CCL, with franchises in major Indian cities. Vishnu Vardhan Induri, an entrepreneur from Hyderabad, is the founder and managing director of CCL. He started the league in 2010 by selling franchise rights for four teams in the inaugural season. For the second season, two additional teams were added.

History

First season
The inaugural season took place in 2011 and included participation from four teams - Chennai Rhinos, Telugu Warriors, Mumbai Heroes, and Karnataka Bulldozers. With CCL season 1, the organizers planned to create awareness about anti-piracy. Chennai Rhinos defeated Karnataka Bulldozers in a competitive final and emerged as the inaugural CCL champions.

Second season
The second season was conducted from 13 January to 13 February 2012. Two new cricket teams, the Kerala Strikers and the Bengal Tigers were added to the CCL. Hindi film industry Team "Mumbai Heroes" selected Sharjah as its home ground. Chennai Rhinos defeated Karnataka Bulldozers for the second time in a row and emerged as the CCL 2 champions.

Third season

The third season had two new teams, Veer Marathi representing the Marathi film industry and Bhojpuri Dabbangs representing the Bhojpuri film industry. In Season 3, the curtain raiser event was held in Mumbai on 19 January 2013 and was regarded by many as a grand affair, where Salman Khan, Katrina Kaif, Bipasha Basu, Prabhu Deva and many other celebrities performed. The opening ceremony was in Kochi on 9 February 2013, where Kerala Strikers played against Mumbai Heroes. Popular Bollywood actor Bipasha Basu was appointed as the brand ambassador for Celebrity Cricket League (CCL) season 3, along with Kajal Agarwal. Karnataka Bulldozers defeated Telugu Warriors to become CCL 3 champions.

Fourth season
CCL Season 4 had a bigger reach than the earlier seasons as Colors TV had come in as a broadcast partner for the Mumbai Heroes games and Rishtey TV telecasted all the games. Karnataka Bulldozers qualified for the finals for the fourth consecutive year. They won the cup by defeating Kerala Strikers.

Fifth season

CCL season 5 was the most successful season in terms of revenues and television viewership. As per TAM, CCL was the second most viewed sporting league in the country due to its reach delivered through Colors in Hindi-speaking markets and Sun Network Channels in South India. Telugu Warriors won the trophy for the first time by defeating 2-time champion Chennai Rhinos.

Sixth season
A new team, Punjab De Sher, representing the Punjab film industry, was introduced in place of Veer Marathi. Daler Mehndi was the brand ambassador of the team, with Sonu Sood the captain. Mr. Puneet and Navraj Hans were the owners of the team. Punjab De Sher selected new players for the team. Telugu Warriors won the cup for the second time.

Teams and performance

Current teams

Defunct team

Total performance

† Team now defunct.

Notes:
 W = Winner; R = Runner-up; SF = SemiFinalist; GS = GroupStage
 2018 CCL T10 was cancelled
 2019 CCL T10 Semi-final and final matches were not conducted due to rain. Based on group stage performance Mumbai Heroes (win all 3 matches) and Karnataka Bulldozers (win 2 out of 3 matches) teams announced as Winner and Runner up respectively.

Best performance

† Team now defunct.

Squads

Venues

 Ahmedabad: Narendra Modi Stadium
 Bengaluru: M. Chinnaswamy Stadium
 Chennai: M. A. Chidambaram Stadium
 Kochi: Jawaharlal Nehru Stadium
 Hyderabad: Rajiv Gandhi International Cricket Stadium
 Hyderabad: Lal Bahadur Shastri Stadium
 Mumbai : Brabourne Stadium
 Mumbai : DY Patil Stadium
 Pune: Maharashtra Cricket Association Cricket Stadium
 Dubai: Dubai International Cricket Stadium
 Sharjah: Sharjah Cricket Association Stadium
 Siliguri: Kanchenjunga Stadium
 Trivandrum: Greenfield International Stadium
 Visakhapatnam: Dr. Y. S. Rajasekhara Reddy International Cricket Stadium
 Cuttack : Barabati Stadium
 Ranchi  : JSCA International Stadium Complex
 Chandigarh : Sector 16 Stadium
 Raipur : Shaheed Veer Narayan Singh International Cricket Stadium

References

External links

2011 establishments in Andhra Pradesh
Indian domestic cricket competitions
Cricket leagues in India
Recurring sporting events established in 2011